College Puzzle Challenge was an annual puzzlehunt hosted by Microsoft from 2003 to 2018, inspired by the Microsoft Puzzle Hunt or the MIT Mystery Hunt. However, several key features differentiate College Puzzle Challenge from these events. College Puzzle Challenge is a timed event, and while it does have a meta-puzzle, if no team has solved the meta-puzzle at the end of the allotted time, the event is declared over and alternate means are used to determine winners. Registration is limited to current undergraduate and graduate students and those who have graduated in the last year before the event, and team size is strictly regulated to four students. Instead of the winning team hosting the next event as with the Microsoft and MIT hunts, the event is always hosted by Microsoft employees. Since College Puzzle Challenge takes place at multiple locations simultaneously, events are coordinated by a puzzle control team at Microsoft's corporate campus in Redmond, Washington. Ground teams consisting of school alumni who are now Microsoft employees manage on-site issues such as holding opening and closing ceremonies and distributing puzzles.  During the event, participants work on a number of puzzles and submit the answer to each one.  The solutions to these puzzles are fed into a meta-puzzle, and the first to solve that is determined to be the winner.

College Puzzle Challenge 2003: An All-Night Affair
Date: November 15–16, 2003
Start Time: 12:00 Noon, EST
Length: 24 hours
Theme: Not strongly themed
Participating Universities: University of Michigan

College Puzzle Challenge 2004: Casino Royale
Date: November 6, 2004
Start Time: 12:00 Noon, EST
Length: 12 hours
Theme: Casino games
Participating Universities: University of Michigan, Carnegie Mellon University, University of Toronto

College Puzzle Challenge 2005: Wonders of the World
Date: November 12, 2005
Start Time: 12:00 Noon, EST
Length: 12 hours
Theme: The Seven Wonders of the World
Participating Universities: University of Michigan, University of Toronto, Columbia University, Cornell University, Massachusetts Institute of Technology, University of Southern California, University of Texas
Grand Prize Winner: Massachusetts Institute of Technology (Team: Super Cow Power)
Note: This was the first event to use the name College Puzzle Challenge.

College Puzzle Challenge 2006: Special Operations for Location, Verification, and Extraction
Date: November 11, 2006
Start Time: 12:00 Noon, EST
Length: 12 hours
Theme: A top-secret organization discovers a mysterious island
Participating Universities: University of Michigan, University of Toronto, Columbia University, Cornell University, Massachusetts Institute of Technology, University of Texas, Stanford University, University of Illinois at Urbana-Champaign, University of Washington
Grand Prize Winner: Massachusetts Institute of Technology (Team: Quarks and Gluons)

College Puzzle Challenge 2007: Regional Executive Department for Taxation of Assets, Property, and Equity (R.E.D.T.A.P.E)
Date: November 10, 2007
Start Time: 12:00 Noon, EST
Length: 12 hours
Theme: Auditing the estate of Professor Solvem to explore its mysterious financial state.
Participating Universities: University of Michigan, University of Toronto, Carnegie Mellon University, Columbia University, Cornell University, Massachusetts Institute of Technology, University of Texas, Stanford University, University of Illinois at Urbana-Champaign, University of Washington
Grand Prize winner: Stanford University (Team: Tyrannosaurus PAX)

College Puzzle Challenge 2008: The Heist
Date: November 8, 2008
Start Time: 12:00 Noon, EST
Length: 12 hours
Theme: Auditing the estate of Professor Solvem to explore its mysterious financial state.
Participating Universities: Boston College, Boston University, Brown University, Carnegie Mellon University, Columbia University, Cornell University, George Mason University, George Washington University, Georgetown University, Georgia Institute of Technology, Howard University, Massachusetts Institute of Technology, Northeastern University, Rochester Institute of Technology, Stanford University, Texas A&M, University of Florida, University of Illinois at Urbana-Champaign, University of Maryland, University of Michigan, University of Texas, University of Toronto, University of Washington, Worcester Polytechnic Institute
Grand Prize winner: Brown University (Team: The Sons of Tamarkin)

College Puzzle Challenge 2009: Making a movie 
Date: November 14, 2009
Start Time: 12:00 Noon, EST
Length: 12 hours
Participating Universities: Boston University, Brown University, California Institute of Technology, Carnegie Mellon University, Columbia University, Cornell University, Georgia Institute of Technology, Harvard University, Massachusetts Institute of Technology, Northeastern University, Olin College, Princeton University, Rochester Institute of Technology, Stanford University, Texas A&M, University of California at Berkeley, University of California at Los Angeles, University of Florida, University of Illinois at Urbana-Champaign, University of Maryland, University of Michigan, University of Southern California, University of Texas, University of Toronto, University of Washington, University of Waterloo
Grand Prize winner: Princeton University (Team: Left for Dead)

College Puzzle Challenge 2010: Apocalypse 
Date: November 6, 2010
Start Time: 1:00 PM, EST
Length: 10 hours
Participating Universities: Boston University, Brown University, California Institute of Technology, Carnegie Mellon University, Columbia University, Cornell University, Georgia Institute of Technology, Harvard University, Massachusetts Institute of Technology, Northeastern University, Olin College, Princeton University, Rochester Institute of Technology, Stanford University, Texas A&M, University of California at Berkeley, University of California at Los Angeles, University of Florida, University of Illinois at Urbana-Champaign, University of Maryland, University of Michigan, University of Southern California, University of Texas, University of Toronto, University of Washington, University of Waterloo, University of Wisconsin-Madison
Grand Prize winner: Olin College (Team: Name Team Name)

College Puzzle Challenge 2012: The Diner Near the Edge of the Galaxy 
Date: April 14, 2012
Start Time: 1:00 PM, EDT
Length: 8 hours
Participating Universities: Carnegie Mellon University, Cornell University, Georgia Institute of Technology, Rochester Institute of Technology, Stanford University, University of Michigan, University of Washington
Grand Prize winner: University of Michigan (Team: Good Fibrations)

College Puzzle Challenge 2013: Corrupted Literature 
Date: April 13, 2013
Start Time: 12:00 Noon, EDT
Length: 10 hours
Participating Universities: Boston University, Brown University, California Institute of Technology, Carnegie Mellon University, Cornell University, Columbia University, Harvard, Harvey Mudd College, Georgia Institute of Technology, Massachusetts Institute of Technology, Olin College, Rochester Institute of Technology, Stanford University, University of California at Berkeley, University of California at Los Angeles, University of Illinois at Urbana-Champaign, University of Maryland, University of Michigan, University of Waterloo, University of Texas
Grand Prize Winner: Massachusetts Institute of Technology (Team: Quarks and Gluons)

College Puzzle Challenge 2014: Seattle Seattle 
Date: April 5, 2014
Start Time: 12:00 Noon, EDT
Length: 10 hours
Theme: A Vegas bank heist
Participating Universities: Boston University, Brown University, Carnegie Mellon University, Cornell University, Columbia University, Harvard, Georgia Institute of Technology, Massachusetts Institute of Technology, Olin College, Purdue University, Rochester Institute of Technology, Stanford University, University of California at Berkeley, University of California at Los Angeles, University of Illinois at Urbana-Champaign, University of Michigan, University of Texas, University of Washington
Grand Prize Winner: Massachusetts Institute of Technology (Team: galactic dogesetters)

College Puzzle Challenge 2015: CPC Air 
Date: April 11, 2015
Start Time: 12:00 Noon, EDT
Length: 10 hours
Theme: Aviation and frequent flier miles
 Participating Universities: Boston College, Boston University, Brown University, California Institute of Technology, Columbia University, Georgia Institute of Technology, Harvard University, Harvey Mudd College, Kalamazoo College, Massachusetts Institute of Technology, Olin College, Rochester Institute of Technology, Stanford University, Tufts University, University of California at Berkeley, University of California at Los Angeles, University of Central Florida, University of Illinois, University of Maryland, University of Michigan, University of Pennsylvania, University of Southern California, University of Texas at Austin, University of Washington, University of Waterloo
 Winner: Massachusetts Institute Of Technology (Team: Zemora Voidbringer)

College Puzzle Challenge 2016: CPC Air Express 
 Date: April 9th, 2016
 Start Time: 12:00 PM
 Length: 12 hours
 Theme: Time Travel
 Participating Universities: Boston College, Boston University, Brown University, California Institute of Technology, Carnegie Mellon University, Columbia University, Cornell University, Georgia Institute of Technology, Harvard University, Harvey Mudd College, Massachusetts Institute of Technology, Northeastern University, Olin College, Rochester Institute of Technology, Stanford University, Tufts University, University of California at Berkeley, University of California at Los Angeles, University of Central Florida, University of Illinois, University of Maryland, University of Massachusetts Amherst, University of Michigan, University of Pennsylvania, University of Southern California, University of Texas at Austin, University of Toronto, University of Washington, University of Waterloo
 Grand Prize Winner: Carnegie Mellon University (Team: TN: keikaku means plan)

College Puzzle Challenge 2017: Under The Sea 

 Date: April 8, 2017
 Start Time: 9:00 AM
 Length: 10 hours
 Theme: Undersea exploration
 Participating Universities: Brown University, California Institute Of Technology, Carnegie Mellon University, Cornell University, Georgia Institute Of Technology, Harvard University, Harvey Mudd College, Massachusetts Institute Of Technology, Northeastern University, Olin College, Rochester Institute Of Technology, Stanford University, Tufts University, University Of California At Berkeley, University Of California At Los Angeles, University Of Illinois, University Of Michigan, University Of Southern California, University Of Texas At Austin, University Of Washington
 Grand Prize Winner: Massachusetts Institute Of Technology (Team: SETH easiness)

College Puzzle Challenge 2018: CPC Magic 

 Date: April 14, 2018
 Start Time: 9:00 AM
 Length: 9 hours
 Theme: Magic spells
 Participating Universities: Boston University, Brown, California Institute Of Technology, Carnegie Mellon University, Cornell University, Georgia Institute Of Technology, Harvard, Harvey Mudd College, MIT, Northeastern University, Rochester Institute Of Technology, Stanford, University Of California at Berkeley, University Of California at Los Angeles, University Of Illinois, University Of Maryland, University Of Michigan, University Of Southern California, University Of Texas At Austin, University Of Washington
 Grand Prize Winner: MIT (Team: Pseudodeterministic Generators)

External links
 

Microsoft culture
Puzzle hunts